Trebinje I Hydroelectric Power Station or Trebinje-1 Hydroelectric Power Station is hydroelectric power plant (HPP) on the Trebišnjica River near Gornje Grančarevo in the municipality of Trebinje in Bosnia and Herzegovina. Trebinje-1 HPP is accumulation with dam toe powerhouse type of facility with a large Grančarevo arch dam. Its reservoir, Bileća Lake, is the largest by volume in Bosnia and Herzegovina as well. The dam provides for flood control and hydroelectric power generation at Trebinje-1 HPP. The dam was completed in 1967 and its 180 MW power station,  A smaller 8 MW power station, Treblinje-2, was completed downstream in 1979.

Reversible (pumped-storage) Čapljina Hydroelectric Power Station, using Trebišnjica waters through compensation basin Lake Vrutak , was commissioned in 1968. The river Trebišnjca also powers Dubrovnik Hydroelectric Power Station in Croatia, which receiving Trebišnjica waters from Trebinjsko Lake across the state border via derivation tunnel.

See also

Trebinje-2 Hydroelectric Power Station

References

Dams in Bosnia and Herzegovina
Dams completed in 1967
Arch dams
Energy infrastructure completed in 1968
Trebinje
Hydroelectric power stations in Bosnia and Herzegovina
1968 establishments in Bosnia and Herzegovina
Lower Horizons Hydroelectric Power Stations System
Trebišnjica
Trebišnjica river damming and regulation controversy